Sidhi Assembly constituency is one of the 230 constituencies of Madhya Pradesh Legislative Assembly. It is a segment of Sidhi Lok Sabha constituency.

Members of Legislative Assembly

See also
 Sidhi

References

Assembly constituencies of Madhya Pradesh